The 4 × 10 kilometre relay cross-country skiing at the 1968 Winter Olympics in Grenoble, France was held on Wednesday 14 February at Autrans. It was the seventh appearance of the 4 × 10 km relay in the Winter Olympics.

It was the first time that Norway won the gold medal in the event. Sweden finished second in the relay, Finland in third place.

Results
Sources:

References

External links
Results International Ski Federation (FIS)

Men's cross-country skiing at the 1968 Winter Olympics
Men's 4 × 10 kilometre relay cross-country skiing at the Winter Olympics